Andrew Stewart-Jones is an English actor, best-known for playing the role of Crispus Allen in Gotham.

Career
Stewart-Jones first came on to the television scene in 2003 in HBO's Sex and the City as Jules. Next he guest starred in 2005 in NBC's Third Watch. In 2006, Stewart-Jones guest starred on Fox's The Wedding Album pilot episode. Also in 2006, he guest starred on One Life to Live in a 4 episode arc as an airline pilot.

In 2007, Stewart-Jones began his film career with Montclair and The Girl in the Park. Next Stewart-Jones guest starred on The CW's Gossip Girl in the pilot episode and the second episode. Stewart-Jones has guest starred on NBC's Law & Order, 30 Rock, and Mercy.

He guest starred on ABC's Castle in 2009. Stewart-Jones had minor roles in 2009's It's Complicated and The Good Guy.

Stewart-Jones has guest starred on Person of Interest, Unforgettable, The Good Wife, the short-lived Golden Boy, and Blue Bloods. He had a minor role in 2011's Mr. Popper's Penguins.

In 2013, Stewart-Jones guest starred in the pilot episode of The CW's The Tomorrow People. He next was in 2013's Dead Man Down. In 2014, Stewart-Jones landed the role of Crispus Allen in Fox's Gotham as a guest star in the pilot episode. He would be bumped up to a starring role as Crispus Allen in the second episode. In August 2015, it was reported that Stewart-Jones would not be returning as a member of the main cast for season two.

Stewart-Jones has done theatre work. He was in 2005's Guantanamo: Honor Bound to Defend Freedom as Jamal al-Harith.

Stewart-Jones starred in 2013's Good Television as Ethan Taumer. In 2008, Stewart lent his voice to Midnight Club: Los Angeles as Martin.

Filmography

Film

Television

Video games

Stage performances

References

External links
 
 
 

Living people
English male film actors
English male television actors
Black British male actors
21st-century English male actors
Year of birth missing (living people)
Place of birth missing (living people)